Bob Ross: Happy Accidents, Betrayal & Greed is a 2021 American biographical documentary film produced and distributed by Netflix and directed by Joshua Rofé. The film offers a look into the life and career of painter and television host Bob Ross, and the battle for his business empire. The film was released on August 25, 2021.

References

External links 
 

2021 films
2021 documentary films
American documentary films
Documentary films about painters
American biographical films
2020s English-language films
2020s American films